Dan Davis is an American football coach.  He was the head football coach at McPherson College in McPherson, Kansas, serving for two seasons, from 2000 to 2001, and compiling a record of 4–15.

Head coaching record

References

Year of birth missing (living people)
Living people
McPherson Bulldogs football coaches